The Barbadian Chess Championship has been organized by the Barbados Chess Federation since 1983. Previously it was organized by the Barbados Chess Club. A separate national championship for women was first held in 1981.

Open championship winners

{| class="sortable wikitable"
! Year !! Champion
|-
| 1924 || Sidney Inniss
|-
| 1925 || Sidney Inniss
|-
| 1926 || Sidney Inniss
|-
| 1927 || Charles Gilkes
|-
| 1928 || W. Stoute
|-
| 1929 || Charles Gilkes
|-
| 1930 || Sidney Inniss
|-
| 1931 || Sidney Inniss
|-
| 1932 || Charles Gilkes
|-
| 1933 || Charles Gilkes
|-
| 1934 || Charles Gilkes
|-
| 1935 || H. Walton
|-
| 1936 || Charles Gilkes
|-
| 1937 || H. Walton
|-
| 1938 || Charles Gilkes
|-
| 1939 || H. Walton
|-
| 1940 || H. Walton
|-
| 1941 || Charles Gilkes
|-
| 1942 || H. Walton
|-
| 1943 || H. Walton
|-
| 1944 || Charles Gilkes
|-
| 1945 || H. Walton
|-
| 1946 || H. Walton
|-
| 1947 || H. Walton
|-
| 1948 ||Charles Gilkes
|-
| 1949 || C. Beasley
|-
| 1950 ||Charles Gilkes
|-
| 1967 ||George Trotman, Charles Gilkes
|-
| 1976 || Philip Corbin
|-
| 1977 ||T. Morton, Philip Corbin
|-
| 1978 ||Ronald Moseley
|-
| 1979 ||Philip Corbin
|-
| 1980 ||Philip Corbin
|-
| 1981 || David Dawson
|-
| 1982 || Peter Dawson
|-
| 1983 || Ron Buckmire
|-
| 1984 || Ron Buckmire
|-
| 1985 || Ron Buckmire
|-
| 1986 || 
|-
| 1987 ||Philip Corbin
|-
| 1988 ||Kevin Denny
|-
| 1990 ||Philip Corbin
|-
| 1991 ||Kevin Denny
|-
| 1992 ||Kevin Denny
|- 
| 1993 ||Kevin Denny
|-
| 1994 ||Kevin Denny
|- 
| 1995 ||Kevin Denny
|-
| 1996 ||Kevin Denny
|-
| 1997 ||Philip Corbin
|- 
| 1998 ||Kevin Denny
|-
| 1999 ||Kevin Denny
|-
| 2000 ||Kevin Denny
|-
| 2001 ||Kevin Denny
|-
| 2002 ||Ricardo Szmetan
|-
| 2003 || 
|-
| 2004 ||Kevin Denny
|-
| 2005 ||Delisle Warner
|-
| 2006 || Terry Farley
|-
| 2007 ||Delisle Warner
|-
| 2008 ||Kevin Denny
|-
| 2009 ||Martyn Del Castilho
|-
| 2010 ||Martyn Del Castilho
|-
| 2011 ||Martyn Del Castilho
|-
| 2012 ||Martyn Del Castilho
|-
| 2013 ||Orlando Husbands
|-
| 2014 ||Yu Tien Poon
|-
| 2015 ||Yu Tien Poon
|-
| 2016 ||Martyn Del Castilho
|-
| 2017 ||Martyn Del Castilho
|}

Women's championship winners

{| class="sortable wikitable"
! Year !! Champion
|-
| 1981 ||Margaret Prince
|-
| 1982 ||Margaret Prince
|-
| 1983 ||Margaret Prince
|-
| 1992 ||Margaret Prince
|-
| 1997 ||Margaret Prince
|-
| 2002 ||Rashida Corbin
|-
| 2003 ||Rashida Corbin
|-
| 2004 ||Teresa Howell
|-
| 2005 ||Rosamund Holder
|-
| 2006 ||Corrine Howard
|-
| 2007 ||Corrine Howard
|-
| 2008 ||Rashida Corbin
|-
| 2011 ||Sheena Ramsay
|-
| 2012 ||Katrina Blackman
|-
| 2013 || Donna Murray
|-
| 2014 ||Katrina Blackman
|-
| 2015 ||Gabriela Cumberbatch
|-
| 2016 ||Katrina Blackman
|}

References

Chess national championships
Women's chess national championships
Chess in Barbados
Chess
Recurring sporting events established in 1924
Recurring sporting events established in 1981
Chess
Chess
1924 in chess
1981 in chess
Annual events in the Caribbean